The Stella Artois Clay Court Championships (later shortened to Stella Artois Cup) was a professional tennis tournament played on outdoor red clay courts. During its existence, it was an annual event on the Challenger Series, the second tier of competition of the Association of Tennis Professionals (ATP). It was held each July, from 2001 through 2005, at the Budaörsi Teniszcentrum in Budapest, Hungary.

Past finals

Singles

Doubles

See also
Budapest Grand Prix
Budapest Challenger (May)
Budapest Challenger (September)

External links
2001 Draw - ATP
2002 Draw - ATP
2003 Draw - ATP
2004 Draw - ATP
2005 Draw - ATP

ATP Challenger Tour
Clay court tennis tournaments
Tennis tournaments in Hungary
Defunct tennis tournaments in Europe
Defunct sports competitions in Hungary
Recurring sporting events established in 2001
Recurring sporting events disestablished in 2005
2001 establishments in Hungary
2005 disestablishments in Hungary